Sinnaeve is a surname. Notable people with the surname include:

Bob Sinnaeve (born 1949), Canadian darts player
Ken Sinnaeve (born 1955), Canadian musician

Dutch-language surnames